The Doom Book, Dōmbōc, Code of Alfred or Legal Code of Ælfred the Great was the code of laws ("dooms" being laws or judgments) compiled by Alfred the Great ( 893 AD). Alfred codified three prior Saxon codes – those of Æthelberht of Kent ( 602 AD), Ine of Wessex ( 694 AD) and Offa of Mercia ( 786 AD) – to which he prefixed the Ten Commandments of Moses and incorporated rules of life from the Mosaic Code and the Christian code of ethics.

Contents

The title Doom Book (Old English dōm-bōc) comes from the Old English word dōm meaning judgment or law – as in Alfred's admonishment to "Doom very evenly! Do not doom one doom to the rich; another to the poor! Nor doom one doom to your friend; another to your foe!" This reflects Mosaic Law, which says "You shall do no injustice in judgment! You shall not be partial to the poor; nor defer to the great! But you are to judge your neighbour fairly!".

The Christian theologian F. N. Lee extensively documented Alfred the Great's work of collecting the law codes from the three Christian Saxon kingdoms and compiling them into his Doom Book. Lee details how Alfred incorporated the principles of the Mosaic law into his Code, and how this Code of Alfred became the foundation for the Common Law.

In the book's extensive prologue, Alfred summarises the Mosaic and Christian codes. Dr Michael Treschow, UBC Faculty of Creative and Critical Studies, reviewed how Alfred laid the foundation for the Spirit of Mercy in his code, stating that the last section of the Prologue not only describes "a tradition of Christian law from which the law code draws but also it grounds secular law upon Scripture, especially upon the principle of mercy".

The law code contains some laws that may seem bizarre by modern standards, such as: "If a man unintentionally kills another man by letting a tree fall on him, the tree shall be given to the kinsmen of the slain." On the other hand, this precept may have anticipated the future common law of negligence, which provides that a person who is injured by the unintentional carelessness of another is entitled to recover compensation for his or her injury. In the context of the aforementioned law, the felled tree would be a valuable commodity.

Manuscripts
Manuscripts containing the Old English text are:
 Cambridge, Corpus Christi College 173 (also known as the Parker Chronicle)
 Cambridge, Corpus Christi College 383 (also known as the Treaty of Alfred and Guthrum)
 London, British Library, Cotton MS Nero A I
 London, British Library, Cotton MS Otho B XI
 London, British Library, Burney MS 277
 Rochester Cathedral Library A. 3. 5 (also known as the Textus Roffensis)Murder 

The text was translated into Latin during the reign of Cnut as the third part of the Instituta Cnuti, and survives in the following manuscripts:

 Rochester Cathedral Library A. 3. 5 (the Textus Roffesnsis)
 London, British Library Cotton MS Titus A XXVII
 Paris, Bibliothèque Nationale, Colbert 3,860 
 Oxford, Bodleian Library, MS. Rawlinson C. 641

The text was independently translated into Latin a second time during the reign of Henry I as part of the Latin compilation known as Quadripartitus, which survives in ten manuscripts.

Editions and translations
 
 
 Liebermann, F. (ed.),  [The Laws of the Anglo-Saxons], 3 vols (Halle a. S.: Niemeyer, 1903–16; still the definitive critical edition)
 Simon Keynes and Michael Lapidge (trans.), 1983, Alfred the Great: Asser's "Life of King Alfred" and Other Contemporary Sources London: Penguin, pp. 163–70 (translated extracts)
 Todd Preston, 2012, King Alfred’s Book of Laws: A Study of the Domboc and Its Influence on English Identity, With a Complete translation Jefferson,  NC: McFarland, pp. 105–48 (diplomatic text and translation based on Cambridge, Corpus Christi College, MS 173)

References

Further reading
 
 
 
 
  VI. Alfred and the Old English Prose of his Reign. § 4. Codes of Law.

External links
 .
  English translation (partial, no preface etc.)
 Alfred the Great: British Library Image

Anglo-Saxon law
Old English literature
9th century in England
9th century in law
9th-century books
Alfred the Great
893